Jorge Gomes Braz (born 25 August 1972) is a Portuguese futsal manager who manages the Portugal national futsal team.

Career
In 2011, Braz was appointed manager of the Portugal national futsal team. Ten years later, he helped them win the 2021 FIFA Futsal World Cup, their first-ever World Cup.

References

External links
 Jorge Braz at playmakerstats.com 

1972 births
Living people